Hierarchical File System may refer to
 Hierarchical file system, a file system that is organized hierarchically with a tree structure
 Hierarchical File System (Apple), a file system by Apple used for the classic Mac OS operating system
 Hierarchical File System (IBM MVS), a file system by IBM used for the MVS/ESA, OS/390 and z/OS operating systems

See also 
 HFS (disambiguation), various topics using the abbreviation HFS
 HFS Plus (1998–2017), the successor to Apple's Hierarchical File System